The Dement House, also known as Colonial Acres, is a historic house in Lascassas, Tennessee, U.S.. It was first built as a log cabin by Abner Dement, the son of a French immigrant and slaveholder, in 1817. When Abner was murdered by one of his slaves in 1825, the cabin was inherited by his son John, who lived here with his wife Christine Overall. The couple hired Arch Hite to turn the cabin into a two-story house with a portico designed in the Greek Revival architectural style in 1833. The house has been listed on the National Register of Historic Places since June 25, 1986.

References

Houses on the National Register of Historic Places in Tennessee
Greek Revival architecture in Tennessee
Houses completed in 1817
Buildings and structures in Rutherford County, Tennessee